The Ralph Rollins House, also known as the Bohen Estate, is a historic building located in Des Moines, Iowa, United States. This rambling mansion in the English medieval eclectic style was designed in 1925 by the Des Moines architectural firm of Boyd & Moore. It was completed the following year.  The facades are a picturesque accumulation of gables, window bays, over hangs and minor projections. The roofscape is significant in defining the character of the house.  Its main ridge  runs the length of the structure, and it features short cross gables. The walls are a combination of brick and stucco half-timber in almost equal proportions.  Together with Salisbury House, it is unique in Des Moines, and probably the state, for literally borrowing from England's domestic medieval architecture.  The house was listed on the National Register of Historic Places in 1978.

References 

Houses completed in 1926
Houses in Des Moines, Iowa
National Register of Historic Places in Des Moines, Iowa
Houses on the National Register of Historic Places in Iowa